= Otanada =

Town of ancient Cilicia

Coordinates: 36°40′24″N 33°54′42″E

Otanada was a town of ancient Cilicia, inhabited in Byzantine times. The name does not occur among ancient authors but is inferred from epigraphic and other evidence.

Its site is located near Hotamışalanı, Asiatic Turkey.
